Vacov is a municipality and village in Prachatice District in the South Bohemian Region of the Czech Republic. It has about 1,400 inhabitants.

Administrative parts

Villages of Benešova Hora, Čábuze, Javorník, Lhota nad Rohanovem, Milíkov, Miřetice, Mladíkov, Nespice, Přečín, Ptákova Lhota, Rohanov, Vlkonice and Žár are administrative parts of Vacov.

Geography
It lies in the Bohemian Forest Foothills.

History
The first written mention of Vacov is from 1193.

Sights
The main landmark is the Church of Saint Nicholas. It was built in the pseudo-Gothic style in 1889–1890, after the old church was demolished. Next to the church there is the Chapel of Saint John of Nepomuk from the 18th century.

Notable people
Matěj Kopecký (1775–1847), puppeteer; lived in Přečín in 1836–1847

References

External links

Villages in Prachatice District